Leafvein Gulch is a valley  long with intensely gullied flanks, draining the northeastern part of Vindication Island in the South Sandwich Islands. Its lower end lies southwest of Braces Point on the east coast of the island. The name, applied by the UK Antarctic Place-Names Committee in 1971, derives from the pattern of the gullies which recall the radiating veins of a leaf.

References

External links

Valleys of Antarctica
Landforms of South Georgia and the South Sandwich Islands